Sir William Douglas, 4th Baronet ( – 16 May 1783) was a Scottish politician and nobleman.

Early life

The son of Sir John Douglas, 3rd Baronet and his wife, Christian Cunningham, daughter of Sir William Cunningham, 2nd Baronet, he was a descendant of Lady Catherine Douglas, sister of William Douglas, 1st Duke of Queensberry.

Sir William was educated at Glasgow University.

Career
He served as Member of Parliament for Dumfries Burghs between 1768 and 1780. He succeeded his uncle Charles Douglas, a wealthy East India Company merchant to his Breconwhat estate in Dumfries in 1770. Sir William later commissioned the building of Lockerbie House. He was also a favourite of his relative the Duke of Queensberry, who bequeathed to him £16,000 upon his death in October 1778.

Personal life
On 21 March 1772, Douglas was married to Grace Johnstone, a daughter of William Johnstone. Together, they were the parents of five sons and four daughters, including:

 Lady Mary Douglas (d. 1841), who married Maj.-Gen. Sir Thomas Sydney Beckwith, son of Maj.-Gen. John Beckwith, in 1817.
 Charles Douglas, 6th Marquess of Queensberry (1777–1837), who married Lady Caroline Scott, the third daughter of Henry Scott, 3rd Duke of Buccleuch and Lady Elizabeth Montagu (the only daughter of George Montagu, 1st Duke of Montagu and Mary Montagu, Countess of Cardigan). 
 John Douglas, 7th Marquess of Queensberry (1779–1856), who married Sarah Douglas, daughter of Maj. James Sholto Douglas, in 1817.
 Henry Alexander Douglas (1781–1837), who married Elizabeth Dalzell, a daughter of Robert Dalzell, in 1812.
 Lord William Robert Keith Douglas (1783–1859), an MP for Dumfries Burghs; he married Elizabeth Irvine, daughter of Walter Irvine, in 1824.

Sir William died on 16 May 1783.

References
Notes

Sources

External links
 Sir William Douglas, 4th Bt of Kelhead

1730s births
1783 deaths
People from Lockerbie
Alumni of the University of Glasgow
Members of the Parliament of Great Britain for Scottish constituencies
British MPs 1768–1774
British MPs 1774–1780
Baronets in the Baronetage of Nova Scotia